The acronym ASSP may refer to:

 Application-specific standard product, a type of integrated circuit chip
 The American Society of Safety Professionals (formerly the American Society of Safety Engineers), a professional society for people employed in the occupational health and safety field
 Anti-Spam SMTP Proxy, an anti-spam product
 Anjuman Sipah-e-Sahaba Pakistan, a political movement